The flag of Laos (Lao: ທຸງຊາດລາວ; thungsad Lāo) consists of three horizontal stripes, with the middle stripe in blue being twice the height of the top and bottom red stripes. In the middle is a white disc, the diameter of the disc is  the height of the blue stripe. The flag ratio is 2:3.

The flag was first adopted in 1945 under the short-lived Lao Issara government of 1945–46, then by the Pathet Lao. It is one of the two flags of a currently communist country (the other being Cuba) that currently does not use any communist symbolism. The current flag was adopted on December 2, 1975, when it became a socialist state. The royal flag before 1975 remains in use by a number of Laotian diaspora.

Overview
This current flag replaced the red flag, with the triple-headed white elephant Airavata on a pedestal beneath a parasol, which had been the flag of the 19th century Kingdom of Luang Phrabang. The flag had continued to be used when this kingdom became a French protectorate, and following its unification with the other provinces of Laos into the Kingdom of Laos, which became independent in 1953. The flag expressed the ancient name of the country, "Land of a Million Elephants". From 1953 onward the royal government waged war with the Pathet Lao, whose flag was blue with a white disk and red borders at the top and bottom.

From 1973 to 1975, the Pathet Lao formed part of the government coalition, before assuming power directly and prompting the abdication of the king. Their flag was adopted as the national flag. According to the original creator of the current Lao flag, Maha Sila Viravong, the white disk in the center symbolizes the unity of the Lao people (and the future reunification of the two Laotian regions of Laos and Northeastern Thailand that are divided by the Mekong River) under one nation. It is also said to represent a full moon against the Mekong River. The red stripes stand for the blood shed by the Lao people on both banks of the Mekong River (the multi-ethnic people of Laos and the Isan people of Northeastern Thailand) in their struggle for freedom and independence from the French, and the blue symbolizes the Mekong River itself, a symbol of the nation's prosperity.

History

The current Lao flag was designed in 1945 by Maha Sila Viravong, a famous Lao nationalist, intellectual, and scholar of traditional Lao literature, history, and culture. As one of the members of the Lao Issara government, he was tasked with creating a new Lao national flag that is to be distinct from the royalist flag (the red flag with the white three-headed elephant) that represented the monarchy of Luang Prabang, inspired in how Thailand in 1917 adopted the red-white-blue tricolour as its national flag over the traditional royalist flag (the red flag with the white elephant). In accordance with the establishment of the Lao Issara government and its first Lao constitution on October 12, 1945, Viravong's flag was adopted by the new government as its national flag until the French takeover in 1946. The Lao Issara, as a political movement, continued to use the flag in exile until its dissolution in 1949. Its communist-led successor, the Pathet Lao, re-used Viravong's flag to represent the movement until the fall of the royal government in 1975 when the Pathet Lao re-adopted it as the national flag.

From 1952 until the fall of the royal government in 1975 the country had a red flag, with a white three-headed elephant (representing the Hindu god Erawan) in the middle. On top of the elephant is a nine-folded umbrella, while the elephant itself stands on a five-level pedestal. The white elephant is a common royal symbol in Southeast Asia, especially in Myanmar, Thailand and Laos. This flag was adopted by the royal monarchy of Luang Prabang since the beginning of the 20th century under French rule, inspired by its similar flag (red flag with the single white elephant) in Thailand during that time.

The nine-folded umbrella is also a royal symbol, originating from Mount Meru in the Buddhist cosmology. The pedestal represented the law on which the country rested.

Currently, the flag, similar to the Flag of South Vietnam, remains in use by the Royal Lao Government in Exile and various Laotian opposition groups who opposed communist rule in Laos. In 2015, the city of Smithfield, Rhode Island passed a resolution to adopt the royalist flag as its "Heritage and Freedom" flag.

Historical flags

Colours schemes

Construction Sheet

References

External links

 

Laos
Laos
National symbols of Laos